The generated σ-algebra or generated σ-field refers to
 The smallest σ-algebra that contains a given family of sets, see Generated σ-algebra (by sets)
 The smallest σ-algebra that makes a function measurable or a random variable, see Sigma-algebra#σ-algebra generated by a function